Apple Pen may refer to:
 PPAP (Pen-Pineapple-Apple-Pen), a single by Japanese comedian Daimaou Kosaka
 Apple Pencil, a line of wireless stylus pens by Apple Inc.